The original Sibiu Municipal Stadium was a multi-purpose stadium in Sibiu, Romania, which stood on the same site occupied by its successor.

References

See also
List of football stadiums in Romania
 

 
1927 establishments in Romania
2018 disestablishments in Romania
Athletics (track and field) venues in Romania
Buildings and structures demolished in 2018
Defunct athletics (track and field) venues
Defunct football venues in Romania
Demolished buildings and structures in Romania
Football venues in Romania
Defunct sports venues in Romania
Sports venues completed in 1927
Sports venues demolished in 2018
Demolished sports venues